Filip Taragel (born 19 May 1992) is a Slovak former road and track cyclist. He competed at the 2016 UEC European Track Championships in the scratch event.

Major results
2010
 1st  Road race, National Junior Road Championships
2012
 2nd Time trial, National Under-23 Road Championships
2014
 2nd Road race, National Under-23 Road Championships
2017
 National Track Championships
1st  Omnium
1st  Points race
1st  Scratch
2018
 1st Stage 1 Grand Prix Chantal Biya

References

External links

1992 births
Living people
Slovak male cyclists
Slovak track cyclists
Sportspeople from Bratislava